Kyzylzhulduz (Qyzyljūldyz) is a village (selo) in Akmola Region, in northern part of Kazakhstan. The KATO code is 111033300.

Demographics

Population 
Population:  (68 males and 63 females). As of 2009, the population of Kyzylzhulduz was 65 inhabitants (36 males and 29 females).

References

Notes

Populated places in Akmola Region